is a railway station on the Hachinohe Line in the town of Hirono, Kunohe District, Iwate Prefecture, Japan. It is operated by the East Japan Railway Company (JR East).

Lines
Taneichi Station is served by the Hachinohe Line, and is 34.2 kilometers from the terminus of the line at Hachinohe Station.

Station layout
Taneichi Station has a ground-level side platform serving one bi-directional track. The station is staffed and has a Midori no Madoguchi ticket office.

History
Taneichi Station opened on November 10, 1924. Upon the privatization of the Japanese National Railways (JNR) on April 1, 1987 the station came under the operational control of JR East.

Passenger statistics
In fiscal 2015, the station was used by an average of 172 passengers daily (boarding passengers only).

Surrounding area
Former Taneichi Town Hall
Taneichi Post Office
Taneichi Museum of History and Folklore
National Route 45

See also
 List of railway stations in Japan

References

External links

 

Railway stations in Iwate Prefecture
Hirono, Iwate
Hachinohe Line
Railway stations in Japan opened in 1924
Stations of East Japan Railway Company